This is a list of Saba Qom's results at the 2008–09 Persian Gulf Cup, 2008–09 Hazfi Cup and 2009 ACL. The club is competing in the Iran Pro League, Hazfi Cup and Asian Champions League.

Iran Pro League

Schedule 

Last updated 26 Apr 2009

Results by round

Results summary

League standings

Scorers in IPL

Goalscorers

14
  Fereydoon Fazli

8
  Mohammad Noori

6
  Mohsen Bayatiniya

5
  Gholamreza Rezaei

4
  Mahdi Kheyri

3
  Mohsen Yousefi

1
  Shahin Shafiei
  Mohammad Hamrang
  Alireza Latifi
  Sheys Rezaei
  Adel Kolahkaj
  Mostafa Haghipour
  Amir Hossein Feshangi
  Mohsen Bayat

Goalassistants 

8
  Mohsen Yousefi

5
  Mohammad Noori

3
  Gholamreza Rezaei
  Amir Hossein Feshangi
  Adel Kolahkaj

2
  Mahdi Kheyri

1
  Fereydoon Fazli
  Mohsen Bayatiniya

Cards

Matches played 

30
  Morteza Asadi

Hazfi Cup

Scorers in Hazfi Cup

Goalscorers 

3
  Fereydoon Fazli

2
  Mohsen Bayatinia
  Mohammad Hamrang

1
  Adel Kolahkaj
  Mohamad Noori
  Morteza Kashi

Goalassistants 

1
  Amir Hossein Feshangi
  Mostafa Mahdizadeh
  Mohsen Bayat
  Adel Kolahkaj

Cards

Scorers for the 2008–09 season

Goalscorers 

16
  Fereydoon Fazli

8
  Mohammad Noori

Goalassistants 

7
  Mohsen Yousefi

Asian Champions League

Group A

Schedule

Scorers in AFC Champions League

Goalscorers 

2
  Mohammad Nouri

1
  Hamid Reza Farzane
  Fereydoon Fazli
  Shahin Shafiei
  Mohsen Yousefi
  Mohammad Hamrang

Goalassistants 

3
  Mohammad Nouri

1
  Mohsen Yousefi

Cards

References 

2008-09
Iranian football clubs 2008–09 season